October 1 - Eastern Orthodox liturgical calendar - October 3

All fixed commemorations below celebrated on October 15 by Orthodox Churches on the Old Calendar.{{#tag:ref|The notation Old Style or (OS) is sometimes used to indicate a date in the Julian Calendar (which is used by churches on the "Old Calendar").The notation New Style or (NS), indicates a date in the Revised Julian calendar (which is used by churches on the "New Calendar").|group=note}}

For October 2nd, Orthodox Churches on the Old Calendar commemorate the Saints listed on September 19.

Saints
 Saint Damaris of Athens (1st century)Great Synaxaristes:  Ἡ Ἁγία Δάμαρις ἡ Ἀθηναία. 2 ΟΚΤΩΒΡΙΟΥ. ΜΕΓΑΣ ΣΥΝΑΞΑΡΙΣΤΗΣ.  (see also: October 3)
 Hieromartyr Cyprian and Virgin-martyr Justina of Antioch, Συναξαριστής. 2 Οκτωβρίου. ECCLESIA.GR. (H ΕΚΚΛΗΣΙΑ ΤΗΣ ΕΛΛΑΔΟΣ). and with them Martyr Theoctistus of Nicomedia (304)Hieromartyr Cyprian of Nicomedia. OCA - Lives of the Saints.
 Martyrs David and Constantine, Princes of Argveti, Georgia (740)October 15 / October 2. HOLY TRINITY RUSSIAN ORTHODOX CHURCH (A parish of the Patriarchate of Moscow).
 Venerable Monk-Martyrs Michael, Abbot of Zovia Monastery near Sevastoupolis and 36 fathers with him, by beheading (c. 780)  (see also: October 1)
 Venerable Theophilus the Confessor, under the iconoclasts (8th century)
 Blessed Andrew, Fool-for-Christ, at Constantinople (936) 2 октября по старому стилю / 15 октября по новому стилю. Русская Православная Церковь - Православный церковный календарь на 2016 год.  (see also: May 28)

Pre-Schism Western saints
 Saint Leudomer (Lomer), Bishop of Chartres in France (c. 585)Rev. Sabine Baring-Gould (M.A.). "S. LEUDOMER, B.C. (ABOUT A.D. 585.)". In: The Lives of the Saints. Volume the Eleventh: October – Part I. London: John C. Nimmo, 1898. pp. 15-16.
 Saint Gerinus (Garinus, Werinus), brother of St Leodegarius (Leger), persecuted by the tyrant Ebroin, stoned to death near Arras in the north of France (677)
 Hieromartyr Leodegarius (Leger), Bishop of Autun, imprisoned, blinded and finally murdered by the tyrant Ebroin (679)
 Saint Beregisus, a priest who founded the monastery of Saint Hubert in the Ardennes in France (c. 725)
 Saint Ursicinus, Abbot of Disentis Abbey in Switzerland, he became Bishop of Chur in 754 (760)

Post-Schism Orthodox saints
 Great-martyr Theodore Gabras of Atran in Chaldia, of Pontus (1098)Great Synaxaristes:  Ὁ Ἅγιος Θεόδωρος ὁ Μεγαλομάρτυρας ὁ Γαβρᾶς. 2 ΟΚΤΩΒΡΙΟΥ. ΜΕΓΑΣ ΣΥΝΑΞΑΡΙΣΤΗΣ.
 Blessed Great Princess Anna of Kashin (Euphrosyne in monasticism) (1368)Repose of the Holy Right-believing Princess Anna of Kashin. OCA - Lives of the Saints.
 Saint Cassian the Greek, monk, of Uglich (1504)
 Blessed Cyprian of Suzdal, Fool-for-Christ and Wonderworker (1622)Great Synaxaristes:  Ὁ Ἅγιος Κυπριανὸς ὁ διὰ Χριστὸν Σαλός ἐκ Σουντὰλ (Ρῶσος). 2 ΟΚΤΩΒΡΙΟΥ. ΜΕΓΑΣ ΣΥΝΑΞΑΡΙΣΤΗΣ.
 New Martyr Hadji-George of Philadelphia in Asia Minor, from Mount Athos (1794)Great Synaxaristes:  Ὁ Ἅγιος Γεώργιος ὁ Νεομάρτυρας ἢ Χατζὴ – Γεώργιος. 2 ΟΚΤΩΒΡΙΟΥ. ΜΕΓΑΣ ΣΥΝΑΞΑΡΙΣΤΗΣ.
 Righteous Admiral Theodore Ushakov of the Russian Naval Fleet (1817)

New Martys and Confessors
 Virgin-martyr Alexandra Bulgakova (1938)

Other commemorations
 Repose of Hieroschemamonk Theodosius of Karoulia, Mt. Athos (1937)
 Repose of Monk Roman the Soldier, of Valaam, martyred in Bosnia (1994)Archimandrite Nektarios Serfes. New Martyred Soldiers For Christ Our Lord. January 30, 2004. (Excerpts from Valaam Patericon -Book of Days- Valaam Society of America, New Valaam Monastery, Alaska 1999. p. 103.)
 Repose of Schema-Archimandrite Alexander (Vasiliev) of the Pskov-Caves Monastery (1998)

Icon gallery

Notes

References

 Sources 
 October 2/15. Orthodox Calendar (PRAVOSLAVIE.RU).
 October 15 / October 2. HOLY TRINITY RUSSIAN ORTHODOX CHURCH (A parish of the Patriarchate of Moscow).
 October 2. OCA - The Lives of the Saints.
 The Autonomous Orthodox Metropolia of Western Europe and the Americas (ROCOR). St. Hilarion Calendar of Saints for the year of our Lord 2004. St. Hilarion Press (Austin, TX). p. 73.
 The Second Day of the Month of October. Orthodoxy in China.
 October 2. Latin Saints of the Orthodox Patriarchate of Rome.
 The Roman Martyrology. Transl. by the Archbishop of Baltimore. Last Edition, According to the Copy Printed at Rome in 1914. Revised Edition, with the Imprimatur of His Eminence Cardinal Gibbons. Baltimore: John Murphy Company, 1916. p. 304.
 Rev. Richard Stanton. A Menology of England and Wales, or, Brief Memorials of the Ancient British and English Saints Arranged According to the Calendar, Together with the Martyrs of the 16th and 17th Centuries. London: Burns & Oates, 1892. pp. 471–473.

 Greek Sources
 Great Synaxaristes:  2 ΟΚΤΩΒΡΙΟΥ. ΜΕΓΑΣ ΣΥΝΑΞΑΡΙΣΤΗΣ.
  Συναξαριστής. 2 Οκτωβρίου. ECCLESIA.GR. (H ΕΚΚΛΗΣΙΑ ΤΗΣ ΕΛΛΑΔΟΣ).
  02/10/2016.'' Ορθόδοξος Συναξαριστής.

 Russian Sources
  15 октября (2 октября). Православная Энциклопедия под редакцией Патриарха Московского и всея Руси Кирилла (электронная версия). (Orthodox Encyclopedia - Pravenc.ru).
  2 октября по старому стилю / 15 октября по новому стилю. Русская Православная Церковь - Православный церковный календарь на 2018 год.

October in the Eastern Orthodox calendar